The Royal Mallows are a fictional Irish regiment mentioned in the works of Arthur Conan Doyle.

By its title it appears to have been a Royal regiment, thus it probably had royal blue facings on their uniforms and a royal blue field for their Regimental Colours. The first battalion is described as "the old 117th", i.e. the 117th Regiment of Foot. From its high seniority number, it could possibly have been one of the Honourable East India Company's European regiments absorbed by the British Army and designated as Irish regiments in the 1881 Childers Reforms.

By the term "Mallow" it refers either to the town of Mallow, County Cork (Gaelic >Magh Ealla, "Plain of the Swans") or to a flowering plant of the Mallow family. Therefore, its regimental badge might either be a Swan or a stylized Mallow Plant (or both).

The short story "The Green Flag" mentions that the regimental depot is at Fermoy, so the regiment could be assumed to be raised in County Cork, part of the province of Munster, the recruiting ground of the real-life Royal Munster Fusiliers.

In Arthur Conan Doyle's Works 

In "The Adventure of the Crooked Man" the victim, James Barclay, was Colonel of the Regiment, which was at the time based at Aldershot. Barclay had risen from Private to Sergeant on merit and was commissioned as an officer in the regiment due to his bravery during the Indian Mutiny (1857-1858).
In "The Green Flag", the patriotic Irish troops of the Royal Mallows rally to protect a small green Fenian banner during a battle of the Mahdist War. The Royal Mallows is partly inspired by the Connaught Rangers which recruited in the West of Ireland.
Professor Moriarty's second in command, Sebastian Moran, was inspired by John O'Connor (North Kildare MP), who was born in Mallow.

The "Real Life" Royal Mallows

The North Cork Rifles, a real-life British Army Militia unit on the Irish establishment, were headquartered in Mallow. They were the 9th (Militia) Battalion of the 60th King's Royal Rifle Corps from 1881 to 1908 and thus used the same cap badge as the KRRC.

The regiment is also called the Royal Munsters in "The Adventure of the Crooked Man", meaning it might be a battalion of the Royal Munster Fusiliers.

In Media

In the Granada television series The Adventures of Sherlock Holmes episode The Crooked Man, the Royal Mallows are portrayed as a Lancer Regiment with navy blue jacket with red facing colours and navy blue overalls with two yellow pinstripes down the legs.

References

"The Adventure of the Crooked Man"
"The Green Flag"

3